Dedicated is the debut album by English singer Lemar. It was released on 24 November 2003 by RCA Records. The now defunct girl group The 411 provided backing vocals for a number of tracks.

Background
Sony Music signed Lemar to a five-record deal after his success on the BBC Television programme Fame Academy in 2002. His first single "Dance (with U)" was written with Craig Hardy and Fitzgerald Scott who had previously worked with Keith Sweat. The second single "50/50" was recorded by the Norwegian Stargate production team. Fingaz, who has produced hits by British group Big Brovaz, also produced the song "What About Love". Lemar also recorded a version of "Let's Stay Together" by Al Green which was one of his featured songs by Fame Academy.

Critical reception

BBC Music critic Karen Goodchild called Dedicated "a great album that is packed full of potential hits that showcase Lemar's amazing vocal ability. That, coupled with the fact that Lemar co-wrote several of these tracks, will surely mean that he'll be around a lot longer than the other over-hyped reality TV stars." Caroline Sullivan from The Guardian found that Dedicated presented Lemar "as North London's answer to Luther Vandross: a romantic of the old school who sells a song with understated sleekness and a hint of chest fur. The contents are all Obika co-writes save for a hip-hoppety version of Al Green's "Let's Stay Together;" the mid-tempo boudoir grooves hardly do justice to the voice, but at least lay the foundations for what could be a substantial future." AllMusic rated the album three stars out of five.

Commercial performance
The first single from the album, "Dance With U", reached number 2 on the UK singles charts in early 2003. His first album Dedicated was released late in 2003 with additional singles "50/50" and "Another Day" also achieving chart success in the UK. Following the success of the album, he commenced his first headlining tour of the UK. Dedicated was certified platinum by the British Phonographic Industry (BPI) for sales in excess of 300,000 copies.

Track listing

Personnel 

Jarl Ivar Andersen – multi instruments
Pete Beachill – trombone
Joe Belmaati – keyboards, programming
Dave Bishop – saxophone
Tim Briley – assistant engineer, mixing assistant
James Cruz – mastering
Snake Davis – saxophone
Joe Fields – engineer
Fingaz – keyboards, producer
The 411 – background vocals
Matt Furmidge – assistant engineer
Carrie Grant – vocal arrangement
Simon Hale – horn arrangements, string arrangements, horn conductor, string conductor
Michael Hansen	– percussion
Craig Hardy – producer
Lawrence Johnson – vocals, choir arrangement
Marc Lane – engineer
Vanessa Letocq – production coordination
The London Session Orchestra – strings
Andy Love – producer
Nigel Lowis – producer
Paul Meehan – arranger, programming, producer
Roy Merchant – engineer, mixing
Mikkel SE – multi instruments
Matz Nilsson – mixing
Nicole Nodland – photography
Adam Phillips – guitar
Nick Raphael – A&R
Brian Rawling – arranger, producer
Fitzgerald Scott – vocal arrangement, vocal engineer, vocal producer
Alan Simpson – guitar
Alexis Smith – assistant engineer
Stargate – producer
Ren Swan – mixing
John Themis – guitar
Derek Watkins – trumpet
Gavyn Wright – orchestra leader
Jong Uk Yoon – engineer, mixing

Charts

Weekly charts

Year-end charts

Certifications

References

External links
Lemar Online page
Lemar Top of The Pops Interview

2003 debut albums
Lemar albums
RCA Records albums
Albums produced by Stargate
Albums produced by Brian Rawling